Wintersoft was a British software house based in Enfield, Middlesex and operated by John F. Humphreys and David A. Briskham during the 1980s. They produced a number of strategy games for the Dragon 32/64, Oric and ZX Spectrum computers, their titles including the role-playing video games The Ring of Darkness and its sequel Return of the Ring and also some products only released for the Dragon machines: Dragon Trek, Pepper's Game Pack, Artist's Designer and Juxtaposition: Barons of Ceti V, and a game only released for the Oric: Operation Gremlin.

Wintersoft's later games Juxtaposition and Return of the Ring were quite sophisticated for their time, featuring 3D graphics, advanced language parsers and a basic artificial intelligence system referred to as "Actel".

The much anticipated Wintersoft game, Usurper of Rune, the sequel to Juxtaposition, for the Dragon 32/64 was never released and no copy is known to exist. However fans of the series still wait in hope that it may one day surface.

References

External links
 Transcription of the instruction sheet for The Ring of Darkness

Software companies of the United Kingdom